Brutal Planet is the first song from the album of the same name by heavy metal singer Alice Cooper. 

It is noted for the contrast between Cooper's harsh delivery and the softer tone of female vocalist Natalie Delaney, who features on the chorus. The lesser-known song "Sister Sara", from Cooper's following record Dragontown, uses a similar template.

A "Promotional Sampler" of it with 2 other tracks was released to radio stations prior to the album release - the song was never commercially released as a single. During live performances, it is typically the first song played after the Spend The Night intro.

The song was written by Cooper and Bob Marlette.

Track listing
"Blow Me A Kiss"
"Brutal Planet"
"Take it Like A Woman"

Personnel
Alice Cooper - vocals
Ryan Roxie - guitars
Phil X - guitars
China - guitars
Eric Singer - drums
Bob Marlette - rhythm guitar, bass, keyboards

Alice Cooper songs
2000 singles
Songs written by Alice Cooper
Song recordings produced by Bob Marlette
Songs written by Bob Marlette
2000 songs